The Heli-Sport CH77 Ranabot is an Italian helicopter designed and produced by Heli-Sport of Turin. The aircraft is supplied as a kit for amateur construction.

Design and development
The CH77 Ranabot was designed to comply with the European Class 6 microlight helicopter rules. It features a single main rotor and tail rotor, a single-seat, a two-seats-in side-by-side configuration enclosed cockpit, skid landing gear and an EPA Power-modified four-cylinder, liquid and air-cooled, four stroke  Rotax 914 engine.

The microlight category version has a gross weight of 

Reviewer Werner Pfaendler wrote, "with side-by-side seating combined with excellent comfort, handling and performance, plus a reliable engine (a Rotax 914 tuned by EPA Power), it has a lot to offer...[It] boasts minimal operating costs, only some 6% higher than the CH7 Kompress Charlie 2".

Specifications (CH77 Ranabot)

See also
List of rotorcraft

References

External links

Official website

CH77 Ranabot
2010s Italian sport aircraft
2010s Italian ultralight aircraft
2010s Italian civil utility aircraft
2010s Italian helicopters
Homebuilt aircraft